This is a partial list of the endangered flora of Brazil as listed under an act published in Portaria 37-N de 3 de abril de 1992 (Act No  37-N on April 3, 1992) by IBAMA.

Categories 
Species are classified in four groups, set through criteria such as rate of decline, population size, area of geographic distribution, and degree of population and distribution fragmentation.

Critically Endangered (CR) - Portuguese: Rara (R)
Endangered (EN) - Portuguese: Em perigo (E)
Vulnerable (VU) - Portuguese: Vulnerável (V)
Data Deficient (DD) - Portuguese: Indeterminada (I)

Official state lists of endangered flora
Official list of endangered flora of Bahia  Official endangered flora of Bahia map
Official list of endangered flora of Espírito Santo
Official list of endangered flora of Minas Gerais
Official list of endangered flora of Rio Grande do Sul

Anacardiaceae
Astronium fraxinifolium Schott - Category: Vulnerable (VU)
Area of geographic distribution: Bahia, Ceará, Espírito Santo, Goiás, Mato Grosso, Maranhão, Minas Gerais, Piauí, and Rio Grande do Norte. 
Astronium urundeuva Engl. - Category: Vulnerable (VU) 
Area of geographic distribution: Bahia, Ceará, Espírito Santo, Goiás, Mato Grosso, Maranhão, Minas Gerais, Piauí, and Rio Grande do Norte.

Araucariaceae
Araucaria angustifolia (Bertol.) Kuntze - Category: Vulnerable (VU) 
Area of geographic distribution: Minas Gerais, Paraná, Rio Grande do Sul, Santa Catarina, and São Paulo

Arecaceae
Acanthococos emensis Toledo - Category: Critically Endangered (CR)
Area of geographic distribution: Minas Gerais and São Paulo

Asclepiadaceae
Ditassa arianeae Fontella & E.A.Schwarz
Area of geographic distribution:
Ditassa maricaensis Fontella & E.A.Schwarz
Area of geographic distribution:

Asteraceae
Aspilia grazielae J.U.Santos  (spelled Aspilia grasielae in the bill) - Category: Data Deficient (DD) 
Area of geographic distribution: Mato Grosso do Sul
Aspilia paraensis (Huber) J.U.Santos - Category: Critically Endangered (CR)
Area of geographic distribution: Pará
Aspilia pohlii Backer - Category: Data Deficient (DD)
Area of geographic distribution: Rio Grande do Norte
Aspilia procumbens Backer - Category: Critically Endangered (CR)
Area of geographic distribution: Rio Grande do Norte

Bromeliaceae
Aechmea apocalyptica Reitz - Category: Critically Endangered (CR) 
Area of geographic distribution: Paraná, Santa Catarina, and São Paulo 
Aechmea blumenavii Reitz - Category: Critically Endangered (CR)  
Area of geographic distribution: Santa Catarina
Aechmea kleinii Reitz - Category: Critically Endangered (CR)  
Area of geographic distribution: Santa Catarina
Aechmea pimenti-velosii Reitz - Category: Critically Endangered (CR) 
Area of geographic distribution: Santa Catarina  
Billbergia alfonsi-joannis Reitz - Category: Endangered (EN) 
Area of geographic distribution: Espírito Santo and Santa Catarina

Caesalpinioideae
Bauhinia smilacina Steud. - Category: Vulnerable (VU)
Area of geographic distribution: Bahia and Rio de Janeiro 
Caesalpinia echinata Lam. - Category: Endangered (EN) 
Area of geographic distribution: Bahia, Pernambuco, Rio Grande do Norte and Rio de Janeiro

Chrysobalanaceae
Couepia schottii Fritsch

Costaceae
Costus cuspidatus (Nees & Mart.) Maas
Area of geographic distribution: 
Costus fragilis Maas
Area of geographic distribution:  
Costus fusiformis Maas
Area of geographic distribution:

Dicksoniaceae
Dicksonia sellowiana Hook.
Area of geographic distribution:

Faboideae
Bowdichia nitida Spruce ex Benth. (spelled Bowdickia nitida in the bill) - Category: Vulnerable (VU)
Area of geographic distribution: Amazonas, Pará and Rondônia.
Dalbergia nigra (Vell.) Allemão ex Benth. - Category: Vulnerable (VU)
Area of geographic distribution: Bahia and Espírito Santo

Lauraceae
Aniba roseodora Ducke - Category: Endangered (EN)
Area of geographic distribution: Amazonas, Pará
Dicypellium caryophyllatum Nees - Category:
Area of geographic distribution:

Lecythidaceae
Bertholletia excelsa Humb. & Bonpl. - Category: Vulnerable (VU) 
Area of geographic distribution: Acre, Amazonas, Maranhão, Pará and Rondônia. 
Cariniana ianeirensis Kunth
Area of geographic distribution:

Moraceae
Brosimum glaucum Taub.
Area of geographic distribution: 
Brosimum glaziovii Taub.
Area of geographic distribution: 
Dorstenia arifolioa Lam. - Category: Vulnerable (VU) 
Area of geographic distribution: Espírito Santo, Minas Gerais, Rio de Janeiro, and São Paulo
Dorstenia cayapia - Category: Endangered (EN) 
Area of geographic distribution: Bahia, Espírito Santo, Minas Gerais, Rio de Janeiro, and São Paulo
Dorstenia elata - Category: Critically Endangered (CR)
Area of geographic distribution: Minas Gerais, Espírito Santo, Rio de Janeiro
Dorstenia ficus - Category: Critically Endangered (CR) 
Area of geographic distribution: Rio de Janeiro
Dorstenia fischeri - Category: Endangered (EN)
Area of geographic distribution: Rio de Janeiro
Dorstenia ramosa - Category: Vulnerable (VU)  
Area of geographic distribution: Rio de Janeiro
Dorstenia tenuis - Category: Vulnerable (VU) 
Area of geographic distribution: Paraná and Santa Catarina

Orchidaceae
Cattleya schilleriana Rchb.f.
Area of geographic distribution: endemic to Bahia, extinct in the wild.

Sapotaceae
Bumelia obtusifolia Roem. & Schult. var. excelsa (DC) Mig. 
Area of geographic distribution:

See also
Conservation in Brazil
Wildlife of Brazil
 List of plants of Amazon Rainforest vegetation of Brazil
 List of plants of Atlantic Forest vegetation of Brazil
 List of plants of Caatinga vegetation of Brazil
 List of plants of Cerrado vegetation of Brazil
 List of plants of Pantanal vegetation of Brazil

References
 IBAMA Lista oficial de espécies da flora brasileira ameaçada de extinção (Official list of endangered flora of Brazil) Portaria 37-N de 3 de abril de 1992 (Act No  37-N on April 3, 1992).

Flora of South America by conservation status
Endangered
Brazil

.
.Brazil
Endangered species
Brazil